Thibaud Chapelle (born 9 May 1977 in Bron) is a French rower who has won medals in the Olympic Games and World Championships with the French Rowing Team.

Awards

Chapelle has won a number of awards through his rowing career. Among his awards are Olympic medals that he earned while rowing with the French National Rowing Team.

Olympic Games

Chapelle won just one medal in the Olympic Games. That is below:

2000, Sydney, Australia – Chapelle won a Bronze medal in lightweight double sculls with Pascal Touron.

World Championships

Chapelle has won one medal in the World Championships. They are below:

2001, Lucerne, Switzerland – Chapelle won a bronze medal in lightweight double sculls with Fabrice Moreau.

French/France Championships

Chapelle won 2 medals. This was in the French/France Championships. The medals are below:

Chapelle was skiff champion France in 2001 and 2002.

References 
 
 
 Mentions Name

1977 births
Living people
French male rowers
People from Bron
Rowers at the 2000 Summer Olympics
Olympic bronze medalists for France
Olympic rowers of France
Olympic medalists in rowing
World Rowing Championships medalists for France
Medalists at the 2000 Summer Olympics
Sportspeople from Lyon Metropolis
21st-century French people